The Book of Lost Tales is a collection of early stories by the English  writer J. R. R. Tolkien, published as the first two volumes of Christopher Tolkien's 12-volume series The History of Middle-earth, in which he presents and analyses the manuscripts of those stories, which were the earliest form (begun in 1917) of the complex fictional myths that would eventually comprise The Silmarillion. Each of the Tales is followed by notes and a detailed commentary by Christopher Tolkien.

For publication the book was split into two volumes: The Book of Lost Tales 1 (1983) and The Book of Lost Tales 2 (1984), but this is simply an editorial division. Both volumes are separated into several "Lost Tales".

Content

Though they cover a broadly similar history, the Tales are very different from The Silmarillion. Firstly the Tales are more complex and detailed than The Silmarillion: they are written in a less formal but more archaic style and include many obsolete words and phrases. Secondly the interaction between the different Elf-races is profoundly different: the exiled Noldoli (or "gnomes", the Noldor of the later histories) suffer decisive defeat much earlier and become slaves of the enemy they had sought to punish. Thus when Thingol feels disdain for Beren it is because the latter is a gnome (not a mortal human) and therefore a thrall of Melko (an earlier name for Melkor).

While many of the names in the book are identical or close to those in the later versions, some of them bear almost no resemblance to their final forms. Tolkien changed names rather frequently, sometimes with several new variants (rejected in turn) written in a single manuscript. Confusingly, sometimes the name applied to one thing is later used to refer to something quite different, the original use abandoned. For example, the house of Elves called "Teleri" in The Book of Lost Tales is not the same as that of The Silmarillion (see Teleri). The original usage of "Teleri" developed until the name became "Vanyar", while the house of Elves called "Solosimpi" inherited the name "Teleri".

In the frame story of the book, a time-travelling mortal Man visits the Elvish Isle of Tol Eressëa where he learns the history of its inhabitants. In the earlier versions this man is named Eriol and is of some vague north European origin. In later versions he becomes Ælfwine, an Englishman of the Middle-ages.

There are more changes visible within the book, and it is not internally consistent, partially because even while still writing it Tolkien began rewriting earlier parts as his ideas about the world changed. The Tales were eventually abandoned, but they were resurrected in part as the "Sketch of the Mythology" which would become the Silmarillion.

Chapters

Book 1
"The Cottage of Lost Play" —the "framework" story
"The Music of the Ainur" —the first version of what would become the Ainulindalë
"The Coming of the Valar and the Building of Valinor" —later Valaquenta and first chapters of Quenta Silmarillion
"The Chaining of Melko"—Melko is an earlier name of Melkor
"The Coming of the Elves and the Making of Kôr" —Kôr is the later Tirion and its hill Túna
"The Theft of Melko and the Darkening of Valinor"
"The Flight of the Noldoli" —"Noldoli" are the Elves later called Noldor
"The Tale of the Sun and Moon"
"The Hiding of Valinor"
"Gilfanon's Tale: The Travail of the Noldoli and the Coming of Mankind"

Book 2

"The Tale of Tinúviel" —first version of the tale of Beren and Lúthien
"Turambar and the Foalókë" —first version of the Túrin saga
"The Fall of Gondolin" —the only full narrative of the Fall of Gondolin
"The Nauglafring" — tale of the Dwarven necklace known as the Nauglamír
"The Tale of Eärendel" —the only full narrative of Eärendil's travels
"The History of Eriol or Ælfwine and the End of the Tales"—an essay about the changes in the framework, and the "unwritten" tales.

Inscriptions

There is an inscription in the Fëanorian characters (Tengwar, an alphabet Tolkien devised for High-Elves) in the first pages of every History of Middle-earth volume, written by Christopher Tolkien and describing the contents of the book. The inscription in Book I reads "This is the first part of the Book of the Lost Tales of Elfinesse which Eriol the Mariner learned from the Elves of Tol Eressëa, the Lonely Isle in the western ocean, and afterwards wrote in the Golden Book of Tavrobel. Herein are told the Tales of Valinor, from the Music of the Ainur to the Exile of the Noldoli and the Hiding of Valinor."

The inscription in Book II reads "This is the second part of the Book of the Lost Tales of Elfinesse which Eriol the Mariner learned from the Elves of Tol Eressëa, the Lonely Isle in the western ocean, and afterwards wrote in the Golden Book of Tavrobel. Herein are told the Tales of Beren and Tinúviel, of Turambar, of the Fall of Gondolin and of the Necklace of the Dwarves."

Comparison with The Silmarillion 

The following is a direct comparison between the contents of the early Book of Lost Tales and the later sketches that became The Silmarillion. Although one of the Lost Tales often corresponds to more tales from The Silmarillion, still the narrative in the Lost Tales is more extended (typically, 50% pages more). In J. R. R. Tolkien's notebooks, the fourth and fifth tales were a single one, told by the character Meril-i-Turinqi, but Christopher Tolkien decided to separate them because of their length. The same applies to the sixth and seventh tales, told by Lindo.

Reception 

The science fiction critic Dave Langford reviewed The Book of Lost Tales II for White Dwarf #59, stating that he had mixed feelings about it, since while it provided some added depth, he was not sure that every detail was worth "annotating with such ghastly solemnity."

The science fiction author Colin Greenland reviewed The Book of Lost Tales for Imagine magazine, and stated that "Those who prefer their fairy-tales sophisticated, in weighty prose with scholarly footnotes and appendices, will plunge joyously into J R R Tolkien's first Book of Lost Tales."

The Tolkien scholar Vladimir Brljak, writing in Tolkien Studies, notes that Tolkien's comment on Beowulf, that it was already antiquarian when written, and is now "an echo of an echo", bringing poignant vistas of sad times long gone by, was also a defence of his own writings, where he followed the Beowulf poet in deliberately seeking to create an impression of depth. He did this in the two Books of Lost Tales by creating "an intricate metafictional structure", embedding his works in a framework of " translations of redactions of ancient works, telling of things even more ancient." Brljak argues that this framework is "both the cornerstone and crowning achievement of Tolkien's mature literary work."

Reviews
Part I:
Review by Paul M. Lloyd (1984) in Fantasy Review, June 1984
Review by Darrell Schweitzer (1984) in Science Fiction Review, Fall 1984
Review by Judith Hanna (1985) in Paperback Inferno, #55
Part II:
Review by Brian Stableford (1984) in Fantasy Review, December 1984
Review by Andy Sawyer (1986) in Paperback Inferno, #63

See also

 Unfinished Tales (1980)
 The Children of Húrin (2007)

Notelist

References

Middle-earth books
01
1983 short story collections
1984 short story collections
Unfinished books
Fantasy books by series
Books by J. R. R. Tolkien
Allen & Unwin books
Books published posthumously